Northumbria University (legally the University of Northumbria at Newcastle) is a UK public university located in Newcastle upon Tyne, North East of England. It has been a university since 1992, but has its origins in the Rutherford College, founded in 1877.

Northumbria University is primarily based within City Campus located in Newcastle upon Tyne city centre and at Coach Lane campus on the outskirts of the city centre, London and Amsterdam. It is organised into four faculties — Arts, Design and Social Sciences; Business and Law; Engineering and Environment and Health and Life Sciences. Northumbria University has approximately 37,000 students.

According to the 2021 Research Excellence Framework, Northumbria University was rated 23rd in the UK for research power (the grade point average score of a university, multiplied by the full-time equivalent number of researchers submitted). This determines how much funding is awarded to universities to spend on research activity and represented the largest percentage-point rise in market share since the previous exercise. The annual income of the institution for 2021–22 was £307.2 million of which £19.9 million was from research grants and contracts, with an expenditure of £308 million.

Northumbria was named the Times Higher Education University of the Year for 2022. The University is ranked top 25 in the UK for the number of graduates entering professional employment, with nine out of ten graduates working or studying six months after graduation.

Northumbria is a member of the Association of Commonwealth Universities, Universities UK and the Wallace Group.

History 
Northumbria University has its origins in three Newcastle colleges: Rutherford College of Technology, which was established by John Hunter Rutherford in 1877 and opened formally in 1894 by the Duke of York (later King George V), the College of Art & Industrial Design and the Municipal College of Commerce. In 1969, the three colleges were amalgamated to form Newcastle Polytechnic. The Polytechnic became the major regional centre for the training of teachers with the incorporation of the City College of Education in 1974 and the Northern Counties College of Education in 1976.

In 1992, Newcastle Polytechnic was reconstituted as the new University of Northumbria, as part of a nationwide process in which polytechnics became new universities. It was originally styled, and its official name still is, the University of Northumbria at Newcastle (see the Articles of Government) but the trading name was simplified to Northumbria University in 2002. In 1995, it was awarded responsibility for the education of healthcare professionals, which was transferred from the National Health Service.

In 2017, the university was fined £400,000 after a sports science experiment gave volunteers a hundred times the safe dose of caffeine. Two student volunteers were given a dose of 30g instead of 0.3g, because staff conducting the experiment tried to calculate the dose on a mobile phone calculator and misread the decimal point. Both were hospitalised and one reported loss of short-term memory. A court hearing heard that the university had not trained staff in safety and had not carried out a proper risk assessment, and that the dose was above the level known to cause risk of death.

Northumbria was named the UK University of the Year 2022 by Times Higher Education. The award was given in recognition of Northumbria's transformation over more than a decade into a research-intensive modern institution. The judging panel stated "The scale of [Northumbria's] ambition, the rigour and effectiveness with which is has been pursued and its role in transforming lives and supporting its region all make it a deserving winner."

Campuses

United Kingdom 

The university has two large campuses situated in Newcastle and one in London. City Campus, located in the centre of Newcastle upon Tyne, is divided into City Campus East and City Campus West by the city's central motorway and linked by a £4 million bridge which in 2008 was officially opened by the former Minister of State for Trade and Investment, Lord Digby Jones.

City Campus 

City Campus East is home to the Schools of Law, Design and the Newcastle Business School (NBS). NBS and Law are housed in one building, and the School of Design is across a courtyard.

City Campus East, designed by Atkins, opened in September 2007, winning awards from The Journal newspaper and the Low Carbon New Build Project of the Year accolade.

City Campus West is home to the Schools of Arts & Social Sciences, Built & Natural Environment, Computing, Engineering & Information Sciences and Life Sciences. Also located on this campus is the University Library, Students' Union building and Sport Central, a £31m sports facility for students, staff and the community which opened in 2010.

The Sutherland Building, formerly the Medical School of Durham University, which was a naval warehouse during World War II, and the Dental School of Newcastle University (1945–78) is the home of is the home of the University Executive team and new world-class studios for Architecture students, designed by Page\Park architects, which opened in 2019.

Administrative Departments including Finance & Planning and Human Resources, are based in Pandon Building.The Students' Union building, at City Campus West, underwent a multimillion-pound makeover with new lobby and recreational facilities, and a refurbished bar and cafe space, in summer 2010.

In September 2016 the Sandyford Building was acquired from Newcastle College.

In 2018 a £7m building for Computer and Information sciences was opened in City Campus West in place of the demolished Rutherford Hall.

Coach Lane 
A second campus is located 2.6 miles (4 km) outside Newcastle, on Coach Lane, and is known as the Coach Lane Campus at Cochrane Park near the A188 (Benton Road). It is in the Dene ward near Longbenton and round the corner from Tyneview Park; a large Department for Work and Pensions office, accessible via the Four Lane Ends Interchange.

The Coach Lane Campus is home to a number of areas of the Faculty of Health and Life Sciences, in particular the Departments of Nursing, Midwifery and Health and Social Work, Education and Community Wellbeing, as well as the Police Constable Degree Apprenticeships programmes. Coach Lane Campus has computing and library services; and sports facilities, including indoor courts, a fitness suite, outdoor rugby and football pitches, and an all-weather floodlit pitch.

London Campus 
The London Campus offers full-time or part-time programmes, from a range of Business, Computing, Cyber, Project Management and Technology focused programmes to approximately 2,500 students. The campus is delivered in partnership with QA Higher Education, part of QA, the UK’s largest corporate training provider. The campus is near Liverpool Street station, close to the heart of London’s financial district

International 
Northumbria University has an international campus based in Amsterdam, Netherlands through a partnership with Amsterdam University of Applied Sciences where it offers accredited postgraduate qualifications and the opportunity for undergraduates to experience overseas studies.

Organisation and structure 

Northumbria  offers programmes in the disciplines of law and business, arts and design, engineering, mathematics, physics computing, geography and environmental sciences, architecture and built environment, applied sciences and healthcare, sports science, humanities and social sciences, psychology, nursing, social work and teacher education.

Northumbria University employs more than 3,100 people and offers undergraduate, postgraduate, CPD and degree apprenticeship programmes through four Faculties:
 Faculty of Arts, Design and Social Sciences
 Faculty of Business and Law
 Faculty of Engineering and Environment
 Faculty of Health and Life Sciences

Newcastle Business School 

In September 2007, Northumbria University opened its new Newcastle Business School building on the site of the former Warner Brothers cinema as part of a £136m city campus east development. Newcastle Business School is the only university in the UK to hold double AACSB accreditation for business and accounting which makes them form part of an elite group of 190 institutions worldwide to hold this. As of 2020, The university also holds accreditation for EPAS in 21 different undergraduate programmes, more than any other university in the UK. Newcastle Business School has also developed relations with a wide range of other professional bodies. As a result, the university can offer a wide range of professional exemptions in its programmes such as the Accountancy degree which holds exemptions from many of the top accountancy boards including ICAEW, ACCA, and CIMA.

In 2015, Newcastle Business School was the winner of ‘UK Business School of the Year’ at the Times Higher Education Awards.

Northumbria Law School 

Northumbria Law School is located within City Campus East where it shares its building with Newcastle Business School.

Northumbria Law School is the largest law school within the north-east of England. It is part of only six institutions outside of London that provides the Bar Professional Training Course. Northumbria Law School is located within City Campus East where it shares its building with Newcastle Business School.

Northumbria also offers 'clinical' courses in law accredited by the Law Society and Bar Council. These allow graduates direct entry to the profession. The institution's Student Law Office is a clinical legal education enterprise, where law students participate in a legal advice and representation scheme on behalf of real clients, under the supervision of practising lawyers. The student law office has managed over 8,300 enquiries, represented over 3,000 clients and secured over £1.6m in compensation since 2005. In 2013, the university was awarded with the Queens Anniversary Prize in Further and Higher and Further Education for outstanding community work of its student law office.

Medicine 
Although the university roots are linked with medicine through the Sutherland Building being formerly the Medical School of Durham University, it has not offered medicine as a programme until recently. Northumbria has a joint medical programme through a partnership with St George's University of Grenada. As part of the programme the teaching hours are split between time spent within the Grenada and the United Kingdom. The programme has been expanded in recent years with an increased amount of time that students can spend within the United Kingdom.

Academic profile

Research 
Northumbria was one of the best performing universities in the 2021 Research Excellence Framework, rising the highest number of places in a ranking of 'research power' by THE. The University climbed to 23rd place from 50th in 2014 and 80th in 2008.

In the UK Research Assessment Exercise 2008 some research in nine of twelve areas submitted was described as "world-leading". In the 2014 Research Assessment Exercise, Northumbria was one of the UK top 50 for research power and the university which had risen fastest up the rankings.

Reputation and rankings 

 Northumbria was named UK University of the Year by Times Higher Education in November 2022.
 Northumbria University is in the top 25 for research power in the UK, according to the results of the 2021 Research Excellence Framework, Times Higher Education REF2021 rankings. 
 Northumbria University is the top University in the North East for sustainability, according to the People and Planet league table
 Northumbria is one of the highest ranked UK universities in the Times Higher Education's Young Universities Rankings (2022-).

Student life 

Northumbria Students' Union is a campaigning and representative organisation. It is a charity currently exempt from registration and is led by six Sabbatical Officers (President and five vice-presidents) and a 26-member Student Council.
The Students' Union offers a range of student activities such as NSU/Community, NSU/Media (Which encompasses NSU/TV, NSU/Radio, NSU/Life and NSU/Snaps), NSU/Rag (Raise and Give),NSU/Societies, NSU/Employability, Duke of Edinburgh awards and Fast Friends. It represents students in academic and non-academic matters through a nationally recognised School Reps and Postgraduate Research Reps Systems.

The university building contains several venues for students to socialise in a safe environment, chiefly at Habita (formerly Bar One), Domain (formerly The Venue) and Reds.

In 2011, Northumbria Students' Union received the National Union of Students award for best higher education students' union.

In 2016, Northumbria Students' Union received the National Union of Students award for Student Opportunities and runner up for the Education Award.

Sport 

Northumbria is considered one of the leading universities for Rugby League in the UK, after being crowned BUCS National Champions in 2017, 2018, 2019 and 2022.

In 2022 Northumbria entered 69 teams into BUCS, the highest number to date for the university.   

Sport Awards:

 In 2014 Northumbria won the BUCS Most Improved University for Sport award following a rise in the national ranking from 20th in 2010 to 8th in 2014 where they remained until 2017.
 In 2017 Sport’s Student Leadership and Workforce programme was recognised as the best in the country when awarded the BUCS Workforce Development programme of the year.  

Sporting Alumni:

Northumbria has several world class sporting alumni including Steve Cram CBE, Stephen Miller MBE, and Victoria Pendleton CBE.

Northumbria support talented athletes through its partnership with the TASS Scheme and their own Student Athlete Scholarship Scheme. Current student Taka Suzuki won seven medals, including five golds and two silvers in swimming at Tokyo 2020 Summer Paralympics Games.

Notable alumni 

 Sam Ainsley, artist.
 Bibiana Aído Almagro, Spanish politician, previously served as Minister for Equality
 Chris Whitty, Chief Medical Officer for England
 Vera Baird, Victims's Commissioner for England and Wales, former Northumbria Police and Crime Commissioner, former MP for Redcar
 Tunde Baiyewu, vocalist, lead singer of the Lighthouse Family
 Amanda Berry, Chief Executive of BAFTA
 Rodney Bickerstaffe, former General Secretary of UNISON
 Gavin Brown, art dealer
 Lord Brownlow, Conservative peer
 Alan Campbell, MP for Tynemouth
 Nigel Cabourn, fashion designer
 Mac Collins, artist and designer
 Chris Cook, GB Commonwealth and Olympic swimmer
 Martin Corry, England rugby international, and Leicester Tigers
 Steve Cram, English athlete and television presenter
 Ali Dia, Senegalese footballer
 Rick Dickinson, designer of the ZX81 computer
 Anke Domscheit-Berg, member of the German Bundestag
 Robbie Elliott, footballer and coach
 John Fashanu, footballer and TV personality
 Toby Flood, England rugby international, and Leicester Tigers
 Bridget Galloway, Sunderland A.F.C. Ladies and England youth international
 Mary Glindon, MP for North Tyneside
 Lady Edwina Louise Grosvenor, prison reformer
 Scott Henshall, fashion designer
 Max Lamb, furniture designer
 Jason Holland, designer
 Louise Hopkins, artist
 Ben Houchen, the first Mayor of Tees Valley
 Chris Salkeld (born 1991), racing driver
 Sir Jonathan Ive, industrial designer, Chief Design Officer (CDO) of Apple Inc. and Chancellor of the Royal College of Art in London
 Kevan Jones, MP for North Durham
 Riley Jones, actor
 Bharti Kher, contemporary artist
 Emma Lewell-Buck, MP for South Shields
 Duncan Lloyd, lead guitarist of Maxïmo Park
 Guy Mankowski, author
 Neil Marshall, film director
 Alexei Mordashov, Russian business oligarch
 Bob Murray, former chairman of Sunderland AFC
 Jamie Noon, England rugby international, and Newcastle Falcons player
 Victoria Pendleton, Olympic cyclist
 Laura Pidcock, former MP for North West Durham
 Jonathon Prested, poker player
 Gerry Steinberg, former MP for City of Durham
 Sting, musician
 Alan Tomes, Rugby International Scotland and British Lions
 Kevin Whately, actor
 Stewart Wingate, CEO of Gatwick Airport
 Zeb Kyffin, professional cyclist for Ribble Weldtite

Arms

The university states 'Northumbria's shield contains two triple-towered castles, representing the City of Newcastle upon Tyne, and an open book which represents learning. The arched line of battlements dividing the shield refers to the Roman Wall, a historic feature of Northumberland. Whilst the curve of the arch reflects the King George the Fifth Bridge over the River Tyne, more generally the bridge alludes to the university's role in the transmission of knowledge to, and strong links, with the society in which its located.'
The crest is a lion grasping a flaming torch which is an emblem of learning, also a trident as the emblem of the old god of the River Tyne. The supporters are seahorses referencing the arms of Newcastle upon Tyne but with the addition of crowns around their necks, alluding to the roman Wall and holding tridents of the River Tyne.

See also 
 Armorial of UK universities
 Bullocksteads Sports Ground
 JISC infoNet
 Kingston Park (stadium)
 List of universities in the United Kingdom
 Post-1992 universities
 Rankings of universities in the United Kingdom
 Sport Central
 Universities in the United Kingdom

References

Further reading

External links 

 Students' Union
 Northumbria University
 Northumbria Sport

 
Buildings and structures in Newcastle upon Tyne
Educational institutions established in 1969
1969 establishments in England
Universities UK